The Tiger, the Brahmin and the Jackal is a popular Indian folklore with a long history and many variants. The earliest record of the folklore was included in the Panchatantra, which dates the story between 200 BCE and 300 CE.

Mary Frere included a version in her 1868 collection of Indian folktales, Old Deccan Days, the first collection of Indian folktales in English.  A version was also included in Joseph Jacobs' collection Indian Fairy Tales.

Plot
A holy man passes a tiger in a trap. The tiger pleads for his release, promising not to eat the Brahmin. The Brahmin sets him free but no sooner is the tiger out of the cage then he says he is going to eat the Brahmin, going back on his promise.  The Brahmin is horrified and tells the tiger how unjust he is. They agree to ask the first three things they encounter to judge between them.  The first thing they encounter is a tree, who, having suffered at the hands of humans, answers that the tiger should eat the Brahmin. Next a buffalo, exploited and mistreated by humans, agrees it is only just that the Brahmin should be eaten.  Finally they meet a jackal who, sympathetic to the Brahmin's plight, at first feigns incomprehension of what has happened and asks to see the trap. Once there he claims he still doesn't understand. The tiger gets back in the trap to demonstrate and the jackal quickly shuts him in, suggesting to the Brahmin that they leave matters thus.

Variants

There are more than a hundred versions of this tale  spread across the world. In some the released animal is a crocodile, in some a snake, a tiger and in others a wolf.

Folklorist Joseph Jacobs stated that the tale can be found in early Indian sources. Some variants are very old, going back at least to the Panchatantra or Fables of Bidpai and the Jataka tales. In Europe, it appeared some 900 years ago in the Disciplina Clericalis of Petrus Alphonsi, and later in the Gesta Romanorum and in the Directorium Vitae Humanae of John of Capua.

There are also modern illustrated versions of the tale, such as The Tiger, the Brahmin & the Jackal illustrated by David Kennett and The Tiger and the Brahmin illustrated by Kurt Vargo. Rabbit Ears Productions produced a video version of the last book, narrated by Ben Kingsley, with music by Ravi Shankar. The variant by Rabbit Ears Productions alters certain bits of the story, where the Brahmin travels alone to gain the opinion of others. An elephant is included as first of the three things (the latter two being the tree and water buffalo) that the Brahmin encounters.

See also

The Wolf of Zhongshan

Notes

External links

Sound recording of the tale
Illustrated web version of the tale
Ingratitude Is the World's Reward: folktales of Aarne-Thompson-Uther type 155, D. L. Ashliman

Indian folklore
Indian fairy tales
Indian legends
Indian literature
Sanskrit literature
Fables
Jataka tales
Oral tradition
Animals in Buddhism
Tigers in literature
Brahmins
Fictional jackals
ATU 150-199